Michelle Renee Franzen (born August 30, 1968) is a New York-based midday anchor for ABC News Radio. From 2001 to 2013 she was a national correspondent for NBC News. She has reported on a wide range of issues and events for various television stations, as well as MSNBC, The Today Show, and NBC Nightly News. Franzen has a journalism degree from California Polytechnic State University in San Luis Obispo, California.

Franzen started her career at Santa Barbara's KEYT station and worked as a producer, anchor, and reporter. In 1995, she joined KFTY in Santa Rosa, California as a general assignment reporter. In 1996, Franzen began working as a fill-in weekend anchor and general assignment reporter for KTXL in Sacramento, California. After leaving KTXL, Franzen became a reporter for KRON in San Francisco.

Franzen is a member of the advisory board for the journalism department of California Polytechnic State University.

References

American people of Swedish descent
American television reporters and correspondents
American women television journalists
American Episcopalians
California Polytechnic State University alumni
ABC News personalities
NBC News people
Journalists from Illinois
Television anchors from San Francisco
Television anchors from New York City
1968 births
Living people
People from Champaign County, Illinois
21st-century American women